The Tri-Cities Open was a golf tournament on the Buy.com Tour. It ran annually from 1991 to 2001. It was played at Meadow Springs Country Club in Richland, Washington. After 2001, the event was discontinued, as there was no longer a title sponsor for the event. It was previously sponsored by Ben Hogan from 1991 to 1992, Nike from 1993 to 1999 and then Buy.com from 2000 to 2001.

Winners

References

Former Korn Ferry Tour events
Golf in Washington (state)
Recurring sporting events established in 1991
Recurring sporting events disestablished in 2001